Jaroslav Šlajs (born 14 March 1942) is a Czechoslovak boxer. He competed in the men's bantamweight event at the 1964 Summer Olympics. At the 1964 Summer Olympics, he defeated Lee Chen-chu of Taiwan, before losing to Washington Rodríguez of Uruguay.

References

External links
 

1942 births
Living people
Bantamweight boxers
Czechoslovak male boxers
Olympic boxers of Czechoslovakia
Boxers at the 1964 Summer Olympics
Place of birth missing (living people)